Qinghai cuisine is the regional cooking style of the Han Chinese with distinct influence from the Hui, Monguor people, and Tibetans in the Qinghai province in Northwest China.

Characteristic features 
Qinghai is populated by Han Chinese, Hui, Monguor people, and Tibetans developing the regional cuisine to reflect a regional melting pot.

The high altitude and rugged terrain in Qinghai limits the crops that can grow in the region though barley and yaks grow well in the region because of their tolerance to colder climates. Meals are hearty and often use yak products such as their meat and butter. The main sources of meat are beef and mutton.

Sour and spicy, sweet and aromatic, crisp and bitter are the primary flavors of the region.

Historically, the Qinghai and Tibetan regions have shared economic and cultural exchanging making the local cuisines very similar.

Qinghai cuisine shares similarities with neighboring provinces Xinjiang, Tibet, and Gansu.

Notable dishes

See also 
 Chinese cuisine
 Gansu cuisine
 Xinjiang cuisine
 Tibetan cuisine

References 

Regional cuisines of China
Culture in Qinghai
Chinese cuisine